Larry J. Williams was a registrar in 1866 and served in the Alabama House of Representatives during the Reconstruction era in Alabama. He was also three Mintgomery city council member for three terms from 1869 to 1874. He and Jeremiah Haralson were both African Americans who represented Montgomery County, Alabama. Williams pushed for civil rights legislation. He headed a special committee that was able to arrange for a conference of conservatives to proceed peacefully. He served in 1873 along with Noah B. Cloud representing Montgomery.

He was a Union League organizer, an officer in the Alabama Labor Union, and belonged to the first Baptist Church in Montgomery serving an African American congregation. He died of hepatitis.

See also
African-American officeholders during and following the Reconstruction era

References

Year of birth missing
African-American state legislators in Alabama
Place of birth missing
Members of the Alabama House of Representatives
People from Montgomery County, Alabama
1873 in Alabama